Iyad Ag Ghaly (sometimes romanised as Ag Ghali), also known as Abū al-Faḍl, is a Tuareg militant from Mali's Kidal Region. He has been active in Tuareg rebellions against the Malian government since the 1980s – particularly in the early 1990s. In 1988, founded the Popular Movement for the Liberation of Azawad. In the latest episode of the Tuareg upheavals in 2012, he featured as the founder and leader of the Islamist militant group Ansar Dine.

Born in 1954 into a noble family of the Ifogha tribal group (an influential Tuareg clan in the Kidal region), his gift for strategic thinking allegedly earned him the nickname, the Strategist. Sometime between 2005 and 2008, he was appointed as one of Mali's diplomats to Saudi Arabia.

Battles and wars

Role in 1990 rebellion
On the night of 28 June 1990, Ag Ghaly directed attacks by the Popular Movement for the Liberation of Azawad (MPLA) on Tidermèn and Menaka, Mali that killed eighteen people, including at least four Malian Army soldiers. These evening raids were the beginning of a renewed Tuareg rebellion in Mali. From 1991 until a formal truce with the Malian government in 1996, Ag Ghaly led the rebel group Popular Movement of Azawad, one of four splinter groups created from the MPLA's disintegration after Ag Ghaly signed the Tamanrasset Accords in Algeria on behalf of the Tuareg people fighting for an independent homeland in January 1991. Ag Ghaly was reportedly escorted to Bamako, Mali's southern capital, after signing the accords. As a result of his perceived closeness to the "traditional hierarchy", according to one analyst, Ag Ghaly was unable to hold together the MPLA after signing the controversial agreement, though ultimately a coup in March 1991 overturned the Accords and fighting went on.

By 1995, Radio France Internationale referred to Ag Ghaly as the "undisputed leader" of the Tuareg rebel movement. After the 1996 ceasefire, Ag Ghaly normalised relations with the Malian government. In 2003, he was instrumental in negotiating the release of 14 German tourist hostages from Al-Qaeda in the Islamic Maghreb, then called "the Algerian Salafi Group for Call and Combat". WikiLeaks later released a U.S. State Department cable in which the author described Ag Ghaly as a "proverbial bad penny" who always turned up when a Western government had to give money to Tuaregs.

Ag Ghaly was appointed as a member of Mali's diplomatic staff in Jeddah, Saudi Arabia, by President Amadou Toumani Touré in 2008. Once "a great fan of cigarettes, booze, and partying", interested in music and poetry, with connections to the Tuareg band Tinariwen, he was proselytised to strict Islam by the Tablighi Jamaat missionary movement. In Saudi Arabia he experienced a "religious re-birth", growing a large beard and meeting with unnamed jihadists. The latter action caused him to be recalled to Bamako.

2012 rebellion

In late 2011, Ag Ghaly attempted to assume the leadership of the Tuareg group Kel Adagh, but failed.

Unable to take a leadership role with the National Movement for the Liberation of Azawad (MNLA), the mainstream Tuareg rebellion, Ag Ghaly announced the formation of the Islamist Ansar Dine, which he claimed controlled much of northeastern Mali, in a video statement. Ag Ghaly also stated that his fighters were responsible for a bloody attack on the commune of Aguelhok two months before. He said the group would continue to fight until sharia law was established throughout Mali. The announcement created friction with the MNLA, a secular group fighting for Azawad's independence from Mali, including former allies of Ag Ghaly who urged him to break his rumoured ties to Al Qaeda in the Islamic Maghreb. When Ag Ghaly reportedly refused to disavow any association with the al Qaeda offshoot, the MNLA branded him a "criminal" and issued a statement claiming the "theocratic regime" envisioned by Ag Ghaly contradicted "the foundations of [Tuareg] culture and civilization". Although Ag Ghaly's militants appeared to coordinate with the MNLA in the capture of Kidal, the Associated Press reported that the day after it fell to rebel fighters, Ansar Dine militants removed the colorful flags of Azawad planted by their MNLA comrades-in-arms throughout the city.

Jeremy Keenan, a professor at the School of Oriental and African Studies in London, stated that the military contribution of Ag Ghaly's fighters was slight compared to the much larger MNLA: "What seems to happen is that when they move into a town, the MNLA take out the military base — not that there's much resistance — and Iyad goes into town and puts up his flag and starts bossing everyone around about sharia law." According to Keenan, Ag Ghaly is linked to the Algerian intelligence service.

On 3 April, Ag Ghaly gave a radio interview in Timbuktu announcing that Sharia law would be enforced in the city, including the veiling of women, the stoning of adulterers, and the punitive mutilation of thieves. According to Timbuktu's mayor, the announcement caused nearly all of Timbuktu's Christian population to flee the city.
On 26 February 2013, the U.S. Department of State designated Ag Ghaly as a Specially Designated Global Terrorist.
On 2 March 2017, Ghaly pledged his oath of allegiance to Ayman al-Zawahiri, and formed the Jama'at Nusrat al-Islam wal Muslimeen.

References

External links 
 Christopher Wise: "The Jihad of Iyad Ag Ghali" (English Language lecture, Green College, UBC Jan 2019)

1954 births
Malian Al-Qaeda members
Al-Qaeda leaders
Berber Malians
Living people
Malian Islamists
Tuareg people
Azawad
Individuals designated as terrorists by the United States government
People from Kidal Region
Leaders of Islamic terror groups
Berber Islamists
21st-century Malian people